Verisa can refer to:
Berissa 
Mazda Verisa